Siege of Pavia can refer to one of the following sieges of the city of Pavia (ancient Ticinum) in Italy:

 Siege of Pavia (569–572), by the Lombards
 Siege of Pavia (773–774), by Charlemagne
 Siege of Pavia (1356), by the Visconti
 Siege of Pavia (1359), by the Visconti
 Siege of Pavia (1524–1525) during the Italian campaign of 1524–1525
 Siege of Pavia (1655) during the Franco-Spanish War (1635-1659)

See also
 Battle of Pavia (disambiguation)